The Cortlandt Street station was an express station at Greenwich Street on the demolished IRT Ninth Avenue Line in Manhattan, New York City. It was built as a replacement for the original southern terminus at Dey Street. It had three tracks, one island platform and two side platforms. It was served by trains from the IRT Ninth Avenue Line. It closed on June 11, 1940. The next southbound stop for all trains was Rector Street. The next northbound local stop was Barclay Street. The next northbound express stop was Warren Street.

The station was located two blocks from Liberty Street Ferry Terminal and Cortland Street Ferry Depot. These were the main ferry terminals for passengers traveling to Communipaw Terminal and Exchange Place Terminal in Jersey City. 

The site of the station was in the parcel of land acquired in the early 1970s as the location for the World Trade Center.

References

IRT Ninth Avenue Line stations
Railway stations in the United States opened in 1874
Railway stations closed in 1940
1874 establishments in New York (state)
1940 disestablishments in New York (state)

Former elevated and subway stations in Manhattan